Birkenhead Corporation Tramways operated a tramway service in Birkenhead between 1901 and 1937.

History
In 1860, Birkenhead started the first street tramway in Britain,  shortly before London.

The Birkenhead Corporation Tramway company was formed through the acquisition of the Birkenhead United Tramways, Omnibus and Carriage Company (known as Birkenhead Street Railway Company Limited 1860-1877, Birkenhead Tramways Company 1877-1890) on 31 December 1900, and the Wirral Tramway Company on 8 May 1901, and the Birkenhead United Tramways Company on 24 January 1901. 

Electrification of the system was undertaken and 44 tramcars were ordered from G.F. Milnes & Co. and built locally in their factory at Birkenhead. Services started on 4 February 1901.

Closure

The first closure was on 30 August 1925, when the Claughton Road route was converted to bus operation.

The remaining routes were closed over successive years until the system finally closed on 17 July 1937.

Car No 7 is preserved on static display at the Wirral Transport Museum in Birkenhead.

Car No. 20 is preserved and regularly carries passengers on the Wirral Tramway.

References

Historic transport in Merseyside
Tram transport in England